The 1926–27 New York Americans season was the second season of the New York Americans. The club added coach Newsy Lalonde and defenceman Red Dutton. The club improved its play to finish in fourth but again did not qualify for the playoffs.

Offseason
Gorman decided to drop the coaching duties and he hired Newsy Lalonde from the former Saskatoon Sheiks of the Western Hockey League (WHL). As part of the dispersal of the WHL's players, Gorman signed defenceman Red Dutton of the Calgary Tigers, however Dutton ended up with the Montreal Maroons. Dutton would later be traded to the Americans.

Regular season

Final standings

Record vs. opponents

Game log

Playoffs
The Americans did not qualify for the playoffs.

Player stats

Regular season
Scoring

Goaltending

Awards and records

Transactions

See also
1926–27 NHL season

References

New York
New York
New York Americans seasons
New York Amer
New York Amer
1920s in Manhattan
Madison Square Garden